Methia lineata is a species of beetle in the family Cerambycidae. It was described by Linsley in 1935.

References

Methiini
Beetles described in 1935